Hugo Vogel may refer to:

 Hugo Vogel (painter) (1855–1934), German painter
 Hugo E. Vogel (1888–1974), American politician
 Hugo Vogel (footballer) (born 2004), French footballer